Al final del arco iris (English: At the end of the rainbow) is a Mexican telenovela produced by Ernesto Alonso for Canal de las Estrellas in 1982. It starred by Olga Breeskin, Martín Cortés, Magda Guzmán, Miguel Palmer and Úrsula Prats.

Cast 
  
 Olga Breeskin as Elsa Rivera
 Martín Cortés as Juan José
 Magda Guzmán† as Elvira Balmori
 Miguel Palmer† as Pablo
 Úrsula Prats as Alejandra
 Víctor Junco† as Federico
 Antonio Valencia as Esteban
 Angélica Chain as Myriam
 Ramón Pons as Mauricio
 Alba Nydia Díaz as Adriana
 Vicky de la Piedra as Guillermina
 Carmen del Valle as Estela
 Roberto Antúnez† as Asunción
 Susana Cabrera as Lucha
 Javier Ruán† as Leopoldo Rivera "El Pollo"
 Yolanda Liévana as Zuilma
 Ana Patricia Rojo as Caramelo
 Carlos Espejel as El Chicles
 José Chávez as Gregorio Pineda
 Carmen Cortés as Piedad
 Miguel Manzano† as Marcelo
 Eduardo Liñán as Luis Ernesto Samper
 Sergio Zuani as Filemón

Awards

References

External links 

Mexican telenovelas
1982 telenovelas
Televisa telenovelas
1982 Mexican television series debuts
1982 Mexican television series endings
Spanish-language telenovelas